Farooq Abad railway station is located in Farooqabad, Sheikhupura District, Punjab, Pakistan.

See also
 List of railway stations in Pakistan
 Pakistan Railways

References

External links

Railway stations in Sheikhupura District
Railway stations on Shahdara Bagh–Sangla Hill Branch Line